Aspergillus clavatonanicus is a species of fungus in the genus Aspergillus. It is from the Clavati section. The species was first described in 1955. A. clavatonanicus has been reported to produce antafumicins, glyanthrypine, kotanins, tryptoquivalines, and tryptoquivalones.

References 

clavatonanicus
Fungi described in 1955